Tickle torture is the use of tickling to abuse, dominate, harass, humiliate, or interrogate an individual.  While laughter is popularly thought of as a pleasure response, in tickle torture, the one being tickled may laugh whether or not they find the experience pleasant. In a tickling situation, laughter can indicate a panic reflex rather than a pleasure response, and the tickling may be a consensual activity or one that is forced, depending on the circumstances. In a consensual form, tickle torture may be part of a mutually fulfilling, physically intimate act between partners. However, forced tickle torture can cause real physical and mental distress in a victim, which is why it has been used as an interrogation method or to simply show dominance over another person. Usually tickling is done on feet and armpits after tying the person's ankles and wrists. The recipient is also often stripped to their underwear.

Historical anecdotes

An article in the British Medical Journal about European tortures describes a method of tickle torture in which a goat was compelled to lick the victim's feet because they had been dipped in salt water. Once the goat had licked the salt off, the victim's feet would be dipped in the salt water again and the process would be repeated. However, it remains unclear if this method was ever used in practice as it is only described in the 1502 Tractatus de indiciis et tortura by the Italian jurist and monk Franciscus Brunus de San Severino – a treatise that actually cautioned against torture in general – and while it seems clear that Franciscus Brunus had not made up this practice, the issue is left open whether the inclusion in the treatise is based on hearsay, (reliable) eye-witness accounts, or personal experience. This uncertainty does not preclude this anecdote from being repeated in popular culture, for instance during a 2013 episode of the British satirical quiz show QI.

In ancient Japan, those in positions of authority could administer punishments to those convicted of crimes that were beyond the criminal code. This was called shikei, which translates as ‘private punishment.’ One such torture was kusuguri-zeme: "merciless tickling."

In Vernon Wiehe's book Sibling Abuse, he published his research findings regarding 150 adults who were abused by their siblings during childhood. Several reported tickling as a type of physical abuse they experienced, and based on these reports it was revealed that abusive tickling is capable of provoking extreme physiological reactions in the victim, such as vomiting, urinary incontinence, and losing consciousness due to inability to breathe. There is currently no evidence that tickle torture was ever widespread or was practiced by governments. The very small amount of related documentation discovered thus far originates from England and the United States.

A 1903 article described an immobilized suicidal patient at the Hudson River State Hospital who was tied to a bed for his own safety. While he lay helpless, the patient's feet were tickled by one of the hospital attendants, Frank A. Sanders. "Sanders is said to have confessed that while intoxicated he amused himself by tickling the feet and ribs of Hayes and pulling his nose." Sanders also gave his restrained victim a black eye. Another hospital employee came upon Sanders while he was entertaining himself at his patient's expense, and the criminal was brought before a grand jury.

An 1887 article entitled "England in Old Times" states, "Gone, too, are the parish stocks, in which male offenders against public morality formerly sat imprisoned, with their legs held fast beneath a heavy wooden yoke, while sundry small but fiendish boys improved the occasion by deliberately pulling off their shoes and tickling the soles of the men’s defenseless feet."

Other uses and meanings
The term tickle torture can apply to many different situations that do not include the aforementioned acts of either sexual gratification or malicious torture.

A common form of tickle torture is tickling being used by siblings as an alternative of using outright violence to attempt to dominate each other or settle disputes.

Tickle torture can be an extended act of tickling where the recipient of the tickling would view it as a long time or tickling of an intense nature. This can be due to the length of time they are tickled, the intensity of the tickling or the areas that are being tickled. This can simply be a 30-second tickle applied to the victim's bare feet, which can seem like a much longer time if the victim's feet are very ticklish. While the palm of the hand is far more sensitive to touch, other commonly ticklish areas include the armpits, sides of the torso, neck, knee, midriff, thighs, navel, and the ribs. Many people consider the soles of their feet the most ticklish, due to the many nerve endings located there: this explains why tickling one's feet against their will is the most common example of "tickle torture".

"Tickle torture" may also have other uses, including the act of tickling a person as a means of humiliating someone, or even an interrogation method. This may not be extreme tickling, but could include prolonged tickling upon a sensitive area until the victim has released the required information. In the former case, it could be used as a way of humiliating a person, as the act of being tickled can produce many sounds and sensations that could be viewed as being embarrassing to the victim. In this way, the tickling can continue to the point where a certain reaction is revealed.

This method of "humiliating" could also incorporate the use of physical restraint or restraint using materials. This would be done to leave a desired area of the body bare and vulnerable to the tickling, in a way that the victim would not be able to remove this area from the tickling, and would have to simply endure. This can also be seen as "punishment" or "payback" as the tickler could be using the tickling as retribution from a previous tickling experience or "humiliating event".

Consensual

In sexual fetishism, tickle torture is an activity between consenting partners. A torture session usually begins with one partner allowing the other to tie them up in a position that exposes bare parts of the body, particularly those that are sensitive to tickling. Though many parts of the human body are deemed ticklish, tickle torture is commonly associated with the tickling of the bare feet or armpits.

The bondage methods of the tickling usually follows the same basic methods. The object of the bondage is to render the victim unable to remove themselves from the tickling, as well as rendering the ticklish areas of the victim vulnerable. The victim is usually bound in a sitting or lying position rather than a standing one as to expose the soles of the feet which are often among the areas upon which tickling is inflicted. The restraint of the arms above the head leaves the upper body and underarms susceptible to the tickling. This enables the torturer to use whatever they want, e.g. fingers, tongue, beard, feathers, brush, pine cones, salt sticks, electric toothbrush or a hairbrush.

See also
 Death from laughter
 Massage
 Tickling game

References

Torture
Tickling
BDSM